Boris Steimetz (born 27 July 1987 at Saint-Denis, Réunion) is a French swimmer. He was part of the silver medal winning team of the 4 × 100 metre freestyle relay at the 2008 Summer Olympics, after he swam in the heats.

External links

External links
 
 

1987 births
Living people
Sportspeople from Saint-Denis, Réunion
Olympic swimmers of France
Swimmers at the 2008 Summer Olympics
Olympic silver medalists for France
French male freestyle swimmers
Medalists at the 2008 Summer Olympics
Olympic silver medalists in swimming
Universiade medalists in swimming
Universiade silver medalists for France
Universiade bronze medalists for France
Medalists at the 2009 Summer Universiade
Medalists at the FINA World Swimming Championships (25 m)